The 1962 Gotham Bowl was the second and final edition of the college football bowl game, played at Yankee Stadium in New York City on Saturday, December 15. Part of the 1962–63 bowl game season, it matched the Nebraska Cornhuskers of the Big Eight Conference and the independent Miami Hurricanes.

Teams

Nebraska

The Cornhuskers finished third in the Big Eight Conference under first-year head coach Bob Devaney, but were in a bowl game for the first time in eight years.

Miami

It was the second straight bowl appearance for the Hurricanes; they lost fell by one point to Syracuse in the Liberty Bowl the previous year.

Background
A week before the game, most newspaper workers in New York City went on strike, which limited coverage of the game in the city.

The invitation process was also poorly handled.  Nebraska only agreed to play 11 days before the game was to be played.  Even then, the game almost didn't happen. The pilot of the Cornhuskers' team plane refused to take off until he received word that the expenditures check cleared. The temperature at kickoff was a damp .  While attendance was officially announced as 6,166, only a couple of thousand people were actually in the stadium.

Scoring
First quarter 
Nebraska – Bill Thornton 2-yard run (Dennis Claridge run failed), 7:21 remaining
Miami – Ben Rizzo 10-yard pass from George Mira (Bobby Wilson kick failed), 0:29
Second quarter
Miami – Nick Spinnelli 30-yard pass from Mira (Mira pass failed), 12:31
Nebraska – Willie Ross 92-yard kickoff return (Rudy Johnson kick), 12:18
Miami – Nick Ryder 1-yard run (Ryder pass from Mira), 7:20
Nebraska – Mike Eger 6-yard pass from Claridge (Johnson kick), 0:42
Third quarter
Miami – John Bennett 3-yard run (Wilson kick), 8:44
Nebraska – Thornton 1-yard run (Claridge run), 0:08
Fourth quarter
Nebraska – Ross 1-yard run (Thornton run), 13:32
Miami – Ryder 1-yard run (Wilson kick), 9:29

Mira was driving his team for the win in the closing minutes, but was intercepted by Bob Brown; the Huskers held on to win the second and last Gotham Bowl.

Statistics
{| class=wikitable style="text-align:center"
! Statistics !! Nebraska !! Miami
|-
|First downs ||12 ||34
|-
|Rushing yards||150 ||181
|-
|Passing yards ||146 ||321
|-
|Passes (C–A–I) ||9–14–0 ||24–46–2
|-
|Total yards ||296 ||502
|-
|Punts ||6–37 ||1–35
|-
|Fumbles lost || 2||2
|-
|Yards penalized ||69 ||5
|}

Aftermath
Though the Gotham Bowl was disbanded, postseason football returned to New York with the advent of the Pinstripe Bowl, in 2010. Nebraska returned to bowl action the following year in the Orange Bowl. Miami returned to bowl action in 1966. The two teams would meet up five more times (1984, 1989, 1992, 1995, & 2002) over the next four decades, with all those games helping to determine the national champion.

Both final polls were released in early December, prior to the bowls.

See also
 Miami–Nebraska football rivalry

References

Gotham Bowl
Miami Hurricanes football bowl games
Nebraska Cornhuskers football bowl games
Gotham Bowl
December 1962 sports events in the United States